Choňkovce is a village and municipality in the Sobrance District in the Košice Region of east Slovakia. It is well known for its wine production.

History
In historical records the village was first mentioned in 1409.

Geography
The village lies at an elevation of 218 metres (715 ft) and covers an area of 18.322 km² (7.074 mi²).
It has a population of about 625 people.

Culture
The village has a public a gym and a football pitch.

Genealogical resources

The records for genealogical research are available at the state archive "Statny Archiv in Presov, Slovakia"

 Roman Catholic church records (births/marriages/deaths): 1837–1931 (parish B)
 Greek Catholic church records (births/marriages/deaths): 1792–1903 (parish A)

See also
 List of municipalities and towns in Slovakia

External links
 
http://en.e-obce.sk/obec/chonkovce/chonkovce.html
https://web.archive.org/web/20080111223415/http://www.statistics.sk/mosmis/eng/run.html 
http://www.akevino.sk/pivnica-chonkovce
Surnames of living people in Chonkovce

Villages and municipalities in Sobrance District